Ramón Martínez López (born 4 January 1996) is a Paraguayan footballer who plays as a midfielder for Club Olimpia.

Honours
Guaraní
Paraguayan Primera División: 2016 Clausura
Copa Paraguay: 2018

Atlético Mineiro
Campeonato Mineiro: 2020

Libertad
Paraguayan Primera División: 2021 Apertura

References

External links

1996 births
Living people
Paraguayan footballers
Paraguay international footballers
Sportspeople from Asunción
Association football midfielders
Paraguayan Primera División players
Campeonato Brasileiro Série A players
Club Guaraní players
Clube Atlético Mineiro players
Coritiba Foot Ball Club players
Club Libertad footballers
Grêmio Novorizontino players
Club Olimpia footballers
Paraguayan expatriate footballers
Paraguayan expatriate sportspeople in Brazil
Expatriate footballers in Brazil